The 1976 Hardie-Ferodo 1000 was the 17th running of the Bathurst 1000 touring car race. It was held on 3 October 1976 at the Mount Panorama Circuit just outside Bathurst in New South Wales, Australia. The race was open to cars complying with CAMS Group C Touring Car regulations.

The race was dramatically won by the Ron Hodgson Motors entered Holden LH Torana SL/R 5000 L34 of Bob Morris and British driver John Fitzpatrick. Second on the same lap was the Holden Dealer Team Torana L34 of Colin Bond and John Harvey. Brothers Peter and Phil Brock in the Team Brock entered Torana L34 completed a second consecutive podium clean sweep for the Torana L34. In fact, Torana L34s filled the top seven places.

The competitors in the over three-litre class included ex-Formula 1 drivers Jack Brabham and Stirling Moss, in a Torana L34 entered by Esmonds Motors of Queanbeyan. Brabham was driving competitively for the first time since 1971, and Moss had not competed in a circuit race since his Goodwood crash in 1962. The two former Grand Prix stars attracted much publicity and ultimately qualified tenth. However, their race effectively ended when Brabham lined up to take the start; the Torana's gears became jammed on the grid and a Triumph Dolomite Sprint rammed it hard from behind (in his attempt to find a gear, Jack had failed to put his arm out the window to warn other drivers). Although the Torana was hastily repaired, and reappeared several hours later simply for appearances, it eventually blew its motor with Moss at the wheel. Unfortunately Moss attracted criticism from other drivers after the Torana's engine blew as he continued to drive the car on the racing line for ¾ of a lap, with smoke billowing from the exhaust and dropping oil on the track.

The 2001 to 3000cc class saw Ford Capri drivers Barry Seton and Don Smith take a one lap victory over the Mazda RX-3 of Don Holland and Lynn Brown. Another Capri, the car of Graham Moore and emerging Queensland driver Dick Johnson was a further lap down in third.

The 1301 to 2000cc class also saw one lap margins between the top three cars with the Ford Escort of Eric Boord and Tom Tymons beating the Alfa Romeo GTV of Phil McDonnell and Jim Hunter. The Bob Holden run Ford Escort of Lyndon Arnel and Peter Hopwood was third.

The John Roxburgh Motors entered Datsun 1200 of Bill Evans and Bruce Stewart took a two lap victory in the Up to 1300cc class over the Honda Civics of Brian Reed and Ian Chilman, and Roger Bonhomme and Doug Whiteford.

The 1976 race continues to be a source of controversy, as it has been claimed that a lap scoring error caused the Hold Dealer Team Torana of Bond and Harvey not to be counted for a lap, thus robbing them of the victory. However HDT, the team backed by Holden, did not appeal the results; some have claimed this is because Holden did not want to appear to be doing a disservice to the Morris/Fitzpatrick team which was run by Ron Hodgson Motors, which at the time was Sydney's largest Holden dealership. The lap counting error has been denied by the Australian Racing Drivers Club (ARDC), and by some teams (including the race winners and television broadcaster Channel 7) who carried out their own lap scoring. An appeal of the results was not lodged prior to the expiration date meaning the results as published are final. In 2003 Holden offered Harvey an apology for not appealing the results. This occurred at a testimonial dinner for Harvey who after retiring from racing had gone on to become a senior executive with Holden Special Vehicles. Since that time though, Harvey has caused controversy by publicly stating that he was the winner of the race, though the official results continue to show him finishing second. For his part, Colin Bond has remained in dignified silence.

Class structure

The field was divided into four classes based on engine capacity.

Class: Up to 1300cc
The class comprised Alfa Romeo 1300, Datsun 1200, Fiat 128 3P, Ford Escort, Honda Civic, Mazda 1300, Morris Clubman GT, Toyota Corolla and Volkswagen Passat.

Class: 1301cc - 2000cc
The class saw a mix of Alfa Romeo Alfetta and 2000 GTV, BMW 2002, Fiat 124 Sport, Ford Escort RS2000, Mazda RX-3, Triumph Dolomite and Volkswagen Golf.

Class: 2001cc - 3000cc
The class featured BMW 3.0Si, Ford Capri and Mazda RX-3.

Class: 3001cc - 6000cc
The class consisted only of Holden Torana and Ford Falcon entries.

Top 10 Qualifiers

Results

Statistics
 Pole Position - #9 Allan Moffat - 2:25.0
 Fastest Lap - #9 Allan Moffat & #5 Peter Brock - 2:28.4
 Average Speed - 141 km/h
 Race Time of winning car - 7:07:12.0

References

External links
 Hardie-Ferodo 1000 Bathurst 1976, touringcarracing.net
 Hardie-Ferodo 1000 - Mount Panorama, Bathurst - 3rd October, 1976, www.uniquecarsandparts.com.au
 Bathurst 1976, autopics.com.au

Motorsport in Bathurst, New South Wales
Hardie-Ferodo 1000